Murd-e Seyyed Gambuli (also Romanized as Mūrd-e Seyyed Gambūlī; also known as Mūrd-e Seyyed) is a village in Tayebi-ye Sarhadi-ye Sharqi Rural District, Charusa District, Kohgiluyeh County, Kohgiluyeh and Boyer-Ahmad Province, Iran. At the 2006 census, its population was 100, in 16 families.

References 

Populated places in Kohgiluyeh County